Susan Taslimi (also spelt Soosan Taslimi, born 7 February 1950) is an Iranian actress, film director, theatre director, and screenwriter. She emigrated from Iran in 1987, now living and working in Sweden.

Biography
Born in Rasht in 1950, Taslimi is the first non-European to play the lead role on a national theater stage in Sweden.

She graduated in theater and acting from the Faculty of Fine Arts, University of Tehran. She started film acting with Bahram Bayzai's Ballad of Tara in 1979.

Filmography (as an actress)

Films 
Ballad of Tara (Tcherike-ye Tara, 1979, Iran) – as Tara
Death of Yazdgerd (Marg-e Yazdgerd, 1982, Iran) – as The Miller's wife
Sarbedaran (TV series, 1984, Iran) – as Fatemeh
Madian (a.k.a. The Mare, 1985, Iran)
Telesm (a.k.a. The Spell, 1986, Iran) – as Shahzdeh's bride
Bashu, the Little Stranger (Bashu, Gharibe-ye Kuchak, 1986, released in 1989, Iran) – as Naii
Perhaps Some Other Time (Shayad Vaghti Digar, 1988, Iran)
Gränsen (a.k.a. Never, 1995, Sweden) – as Aisha
En dag i taget (TV series, 1999, Sweden) – as Kia
Orka! Orka! (TV series, 2004, Sweden) – as Schole
The Charmer (Afsungar; 2017, Denmark) – as Leila
Black Crab (film) (2022, Sweden) – as Admiral Nodh

Theatre 
Medea (1991) – as Medea
Death of Yazdgerd (1979) – as the Miller's wife

Filmography (as a director)
Hus i helvete (feature film, a.k.a. All Hell Let Loose, 2002)
Orka! Orka! (TV series, episodes 16-18, 2004)
Det epileptiska riktmärket. (play by Martina Montelius, premier March 2004 at Teater Galeasen, Stockholm)
Älskar, älskar och älskar. (TV drama based on play by Martina Montelius, 2004, Swedish Television)
Häktet (TV series, 2005)

Personal life
Her father, Khosro Taslimi, was a film producer.
Her mother, Monireh Taslimi, was an actress.
Her brother, Cyrous Taslimi, is an actor and film producer.
Her ex-husband, Dariush Farhang, is a film director and actor.

References

External links

 Soosan Taslimi at IranActor.com
 Interview with Rooz

1950 births
Living people
People from Rasht
Iranian film actresses
Iranian stage actresses
Iranian film directors
Iranian theatre directors
Iranian emigrants to Sweden
Swedish theatre directors
Swedish film directors
Swedish women film directors
University of Tehran alumni
20th-century Iranian actresses
21st-century Iranian actresses
20th-century Swedish women
Iranian women film directors